Tenth Muse (also 10th Muse) is an independent superhero comic book series about a modern-day daughter of the Greek god Zeus. It was created in 2000 by Darren G. Davis and originally written by Marv Wolfman.

Several real-life models served as inspiration for the main character, starting with Rena Mero at launch, then later Cindy Margolis or Farrah Fawcett.

The property was optioned for a TV show in 2002. When asked about it, Darren Davis told Nicholas Yanes of Scifipulse.net that "I would love to see this made. It would be the perfect vehicle for the CW if they did it right. I can see Katie Cassidy playing the 10th Muse. This one has a real chance of being made".

Story
Lead character Emma Sonnet returns after disappearing eight years before, with no answers for former best friends Brett and Dawn about where she has been and how she has become the until-now unheard-of tenth sister of the mythological nine Muses, the inspirational daughters of the almighty Zeus.

The story involves a crossover with the Mike Weiringo comic book Tellos.

Publication
The original series started publication in November 2000, published by Image Comics. It was written by Marv Wolfman and illustrated by various artists. It ran for nine issues until February 2002, followed by a collection and a few one-shots. It is now being self-published by creator Darren G. Davis at TidalWave Productions.

In 2005, the series was relaunched as The 10th Muse Volume 2 with a new #1 issue, starting publication in April from Alias Enterprises.

In 2009, a new personification of the character was released in a four-issue limited series called "Tenth Muse 800" set eight hundred years in the future. In this version of the series, the alter ego of "Emma Sonnet" was dropped and the heroic version of Lyxandra became the star. All four issues were written by Adam Gragg and penciled by Roman Morales III (Evil Ernie).

In 2010, there was a new series called "10th Muse: The Lost Issues", by Roger Cruz and Darren G. Davis. These are issues that were previously published as Tenth Muse: The Odyssey graphic novel and the second issue of Avatar's publishing (10th Muse V2). Also that year, a graphic novel featuring 10th Muse with all her crossovers came out. The crossovers featured the 10th Muse and Shi, Savage Dragon, Tellos, Koni Waves and Ezra.

References

External links
 "The Darren G. Davis Interview" - Comic World News - 22 April 2005
 Darren Davis creator profile - PrismComics.org
 The 10th Muse movie news - Comics2Film.com
 The 10th Muse at the Comic Book Database

TidalWave Productions
Alias Enterprises titles
Image Comics titles
Greek Muses
2000 comics debuts